The Columbus Community School District is a rural public school district headquartered in Columbus Junction, Iowa.  It is mostly within Louisa County, with a smaller area in Muscatine County, and serves the towns of Columbus Junction, Columbus City, Conesville, Cotter, Fredonia, and the surrounding rural areas.

Jeff Maeder became superintendent in 2020, after the school board agreed to a shared position with the Winfield-Mt. Union Community School District, where Maeder has served as superintendent since 2015.  Previously, Maeder was the 7-12 principal at Columbus Community for seven years.

Schools
The district operates three schools, all in Columbus Junction:
 Roundy Elementary School
 Columbus Community Junior High School
 Columbus Community High School

Columbus Community High School

Athletics
The Wildcats compete in the Southeast Iowa Superconference in the following sports:
Cross Country
Volleyball
Football
Wrestling
 2-time State Champions (1995, 1997) 
Basketball
Track and Field
Golf
Soccer
Baseball
Softball

Enrollment

See also
List of school districts in Iowa
List of high schools in Iowa

References

External links
 Columbus Community School District

School districts in Iowa
Education in Louisa County, Iowa
Education in Muscatine County, Iowa